James Harris (born 13 March 1954) is a Kittitian cricketer. He played in nineteen first-class and eleven List A matches for the Leeward Islands from 1977 to 1984.

See also
 List of Leeward Islands first-class cricketers

References

External links
 

1954 births
Living people
Kittitian cricketers
Leeward Islands cricketers